Andrej Rozman (a.k.a. Roza, born 25 May 1955) is a Slovene poet, writer, actor, and street theatre producer. He writes poems and creates plays for children and also writes satirical poetry for adults.

Life and work
Rozman was born in Ljubljana in 1955. He abandoned his study of Slovene language and literature at University of Ljubljana to set up a small theatre group in 1978. In 1980s he co-founded a street theatre group, Ana Monró Theatre and was its director between 1982 and 1995. 
He was co-writer of the low-budget TV comedy Vrtičkarji (2000), but left after the first thirteen episodes, disappointed by the production.
Since 2003 he has run his own theatre company Rozinteater.

Awards
Rozman won the Levstik Award in 1999 for Črvive pesmi (Worm-Ridden Poems) and again in 2009 for 100 + 1 uganka (100 + 1 Riddles).

In 2010 he won the Prešeren Foundation Award for his theatre and literary work.

Published works
 S smetano nad jagode (Taking the Cream into the Strawberries), poems and short stories, 1989
 Od talija do torija, theatre scripts, 1991
 Rimanice za predgospodiče (Rhymes for Pre-misses), poems for children, 1993
 Mihec, duh in uganka (Little Miha, the Ghost and the Riddle), poem for children, 1996
 Je že vredu mama (It's Alright Mum), poems, 1997
 Črvive pesmi (Worm-ridden Poems), poetry for children, 1998
 Krava, ki jo je pasel Mihec (The Cow Little Miha Looked After), poetry for children, 1999
 Josip Vandot: Kekec in Pehta, adaptation of Josip Vandot's story, 2000
 Mali rimski cirkus (The Little Roman Circus), poetry for children, 2001
 Balon velikan (The Giant Balloon), fairytale, 2001
 Rdeča žaba, zlat labod (Red Frog, Golden Swan), children's book, 2001
 Josip Vandot: Kekec in Bedanec, adaptation of Josip Vandot's story, 2001
 Najbolj dolgočasna knjiga na svetu (The Most Boring Book in the World), children's book, 2002
 Uganke (Riddles), poetry for children, 2002
 Josip Vandot: Kekec in Prisank, adaptation of Josip Vandot's story, 2002
 Razmigajmo se v križu (Let's Exercise), poems, 2003
 Marela (Umbrella), poetry for children, 2005
 Tih bot dedi (Shut Up Grandpa), poetry for children, 2005
 SMS poezija (SMS Poetry), poetry, 2006
 Mihec gre prvič okrog sveta (Michael's First Trip Around the World), children's book, 2006
 Kako je Oskar postal detektiv/How Oscar Became a Detective, short stories for children (bilingual), 2007

References

External links
 Rozinteater, Andrej "Roza" Rozman theatre site

Slovenian children's writers
Slovenian male actors
Slovenian poets
Slovenian male poets
Living people
Writers from Ljubljana
1955 births
Prešeren Award laureates
Levstik Award laureates
University of Ljubljana alumni
Theatre people from Ljubljana